The Syamantaka is a legendary jewel featured in Hindu literature, regarded to be blessed with magical powers. It is described to be a ruby. The jewel is described to protect its owner if they were virtuous and good, but bring evil to them if they were not.

Origin 
The story of Syamantaka appears in the Vishnu Purana and the Bhagavata Purana. The jewel originally belonged to the God of the Sun, Surya, who wore it around his neck. It was said that whichever land possessed this jewel would never encounter any calamities such as droughts, floods, earthquakes or famines, and would always be full of prosperity and plenitude. Wherever the jewel remained, it would produce for the keeper eight bhāras of gold daily. ("Four rice grains are called one guñjā; five guñjās, one paṇa; eight paṇas, one karṣa; four karṣas, one pala; and one hundred palas, one tulā. It was also the source of the brilliant appearance of the sun god.

Gift from the solar deity 
One day, Satrajita, a Yadava nobleman, and a devotee of Surya, the solar deity, was walking along the sea shore, praying ardently, when the god himself appeared before him. Seeing the god in an indistinct and fiery shape, Satrajita asked him to appear in a less blinding form, so that he could see him clearly. For this, the sun god took the Syamantaka jewel off his neck, and Satrajita saw him possessing a dwarfish stature, with a body like burnished copper, and with slightly reddish eyes. Having offered his adorations, the sun god offered him a boon, and he asked for the jewel. When Satrajita returned to Dvaraka with the jewel, people mistook him for the sun god, such was his dazzling glory that even Krishna asked him to present the jewel to Ugrasena, the supreme leader of the Yadavas, but Satrajita did not comply.

Theft and recovery 

Satrajita later presented the gem to Prasena, his brother, who was also the ruler of a Yadava province. Prasena wore it often, until once while hunting in the forest while wearing it, he was attacked by a lion, which killed him and fled with the jewel. But it could not get away with it, for shortly after, it was attacked by Jambavan, described as the king of the bears, who killed it after a fierce fight and took off with the bounty. Jambavan was loyal to Rama, and was considered one of the seven immortals, or the Chiranjivi.

Now, there was a rumour that Krishna also had his eye on the Syamantaka jewel, and when the incident of Prasena's mysterious disappearance became public, the people accused Krishna of murder and theft. In order to prove his innocence, Krishna sought to find out the true culprit and recover the jewel. As he followed on the trail of the deceased Prasena, he came to the spot where the corpses of Prasena and his horse still lay, along with pieces of teeth and nails of a lion. From there he followed the footsteps of the lion, which led him to the spot of the second struggle, where the corpse of the lion was lying. From there, he followed the tracks of a bear, which finally led him to the entrance of Jambavan's cave, where the latter's children were playing with the priceless jewel. Thereafter, he engaged in furious, protracted combat with Jambavan for 28 days, and Jambavan gradually grew tired. As he was the strongest living entity at that time, he wondered who could be weakening him. It was then that Jambavan realised that he had been sparring with none other than Rama himself. Jambavan, who was hot-headed, but pious by nature, returned the jewel to Krishna, and also granted him the hand of his daughter in marriage, called Jambavati.

This episode is described in the Padma Purana:

Krishna's marriage to Satyabhama 
Meanwhile, Krishna's companions, having waited twelve days for Krishna to come out of the cave, returned to Dvaraka, despondent. All of Krishna's friends and family members became extremely sorrowful and began regularly worshipping Goddess Lakshmi to assure the deity's safe return. Even as they performed this worship, Krishna entered the city in the company of his new wife. He summoned Satrajita to the royal assembly, and, after recounting to him the entire story of the Syamantaka jewel's recovery, returned it to him. Satrajita accepted the jewel, but with great shame and remorse. He went back to his home, and there he decided to offer Krishna not only the jewel, but also his  daughter, Satyabhama, so as to atone for the offense he had committed against the lord's lotus feet. Krishna accepted the hand of Satrajita's daughter, Satyabhama, who was endowed with all divine qualities. But he refused the jewel, returning it to King Satrajita.

Murder of Satrajita 

After a few days, Krishna and Balarama were off to Hastinapura after there were rumours that the Pandavas had been burnt to their deaths in a fire. Kritavarma, Akrura, and Shatadhanva, who had wished to wed Satyabhama themselves, conspired to make use of Krishna's absence from Dvaraka as an opportunity to steal the gem as revenge. Shatadhanva, one night, entered the house of Satrajita and killed him in his sleep, taking off with the jewel.

A sorrowful Satyabhama rushed to Hastinapura to inform Krishna about the ghastly death of her father. Krishna and Balarama immediately started for Dvaraka to avenge Satrajita's death, hearing of which Shatadhanva fled on his horse, placing the jewel with Akrura. He was chased down by Krishna and Balarama, and finally killed by Krishna in the outskirts of Mithila. Not finding the jewel, Krishna reported these tidings to his brother, who refused to believe him at first:

Later, Krishna returned to Dvaraka, and upon realising that Akrura had already fled to Kashi with the Syamantaka jewel, summoned him, and asked him to admit his guilt. When Akrura complied, Krishna let him keep it, on the condition that it was to remain in the city of Dvaraka.

Literature 
The Bhagavata Puraṇa mentions the ruby in its chapters:

(SB10.34.30)
Lord Govinda chased the demon wherever he ran, eager to take his crest jewel. Meanwhile Lord Balarāma stayed with the women to protect them.

(SB10.34.31)
The mighty Lord overtook Śaṅkhacūḍa from a great distance as if from nearby, my dear King, and then with His fist the Lord removed the wicked demon’s head, together with his crest jewel.

(SB10.34.32)
Having thus killed the demon Śaṅkhacūḍa and taken away his shining jewel, Lord Kṛṣṇa gave it to His elder brother with great satisfaction as the gopīs watched.

(SB10.56.45)
The Supreme Personality of Godhead told Satrājit: We do not care to take this jewel back, O King. You are the sun-god’s devotee, so let it stay in your possession. Thus We will also enjoy its benefits.

In popular culture 

The Puranas or the Mahabharata do not say what happens to the gem after Krishna leaves the material world. There has been many attempts in identifying the true jewel and its existence in modern Indian society.

However, some speculate that the legendary Syamantaka Mani might be in fact the famous Koh-i-Noor diamond, which was known to have been in the possession of the Mughal emperors of India, followed by the Sikh empire, and currently one of the Crown Jewels of the United Kingdom.

Whether the Syamantaka Gem is actually the Koh-i-Noor diamond or not is unknown. The Koh-i-Noor, of course, does not match the superlative descriptions of the Syamantaka, and considerable poetic license would have to be assumed.

See also 
Balarama
Bhagavatam
Cintamani
Kaustubha
Kisshoutennyo (吉祥天女)
Koh-i-noor diamond
Krishna
Shrivatsa
Vishnu Purana

References

External links 
Srimad Bhagavatam
Vishnu Purana
The Story of Syamantaka Jewel- Part 1
The Story of Syamantaka Jewel- Part 2
The Kohinoor Diamond

Objects in Hindu mythology
Fictional gemstones and jewelry